Yuj may refer to:
 Yuj, Mazandaran
 Yuj, Qazvin